Kakonko District is one of the eight districts of the Kigoma Region of Tanzania. It is one of the 20 new districts that were formed in Tanzania since 2010; it was split off from Kibondo District. Kakonko District is bordered to the north by Kagera Region, to the east by Geita Region, to the south by Kibondo District, and to the west by Burundi. Its administrative seat is the town of Kakonko.

According to the 2012 Tanzania National Census, the population of Kakonko District was 167,555.

Transport
Unpaved trunk road T9 from Kigoma Region to the Kagera Region border passes through the district.

Administrative subdivisions
As of 2012, Kakonko District was administratively divided into 11 wards.

Wards
 Gwarama
 Gwanumpu
 Kakonko
 Kasanda
 Kasuga
 Katanga
 Kiziguzigu
 Mugunzu
 Muhange
 Kanyonza
 Nyabibuye
 Nyamtukuza
 Rugenge

References

Districts of Kigoma Region